Vaněček (feminine Vaněčková) is a Czech surname. Notable people with the surname include:
 David Vaněček (footballer, born 1983), Czech footballer
 David Vaněček (footballer, born 1991), Czech footballer and under-19 national team representative
 František Vaněček, Czech gymnast
 Vítek Vaněček, Czech ice hockey player

Czech-language surnames